Roaring Twenties is a common reference to the social change and turmoil associated with the 1920s.

Roaring Twenties may also refer to:

The Roaring Twenties, American 1939 gangster drama starring James Cagney and Humphrey Bogart
The Roaring 20's (TV series), American television show that aired 1960–1962
Roaring 20's (film), a 2021 French film
The Roaring Twenties (band), English art rock/new wave band
Roaring 20s (album), an album by Rizzle Kicks
"Roaring 20s", song by American band Panic! at the Disco from their album Pray For The Wicked
"Roaring 20s", song by American rapper Flo Milli